Walter Charles "Mush" Crawford (December 23, 1898 – October 27, 1966) was an American football player and coach.  He played professionally as a  guard in the National Football League (NFL). Crawford first played with the Chicago Bears during the 1925 NFL season. During the 1927 NFL season he played with the New York Yankees. He also had been a member of the Chicago Bulls of the American Football League during the 1926 American Football League season.

Crawford served as the head football coach at San Jose State University from 1929 to 1931 and at the Stout Institute—now known as the University of Wisconsin–Stout—from 1935 to 1937.

Head coaching record

Football

References

1898 births
1966 deaths
American football guards
Basketball coaches from Illinois
Beloit Buccaneers football players
Chicago Bears players
Chicago Bulls (American football) players
Illinois Fighting Illini football players
Lake Forest Foresters football players
Miami Hurricanes football coaches
New York Yankees (NFL) players
San Jose State Spartans baseball coaches
San Jose State Spartans football coaches
Wisconsin–Stout Blue Devils baseball coaches
Wisconsin–Stout Blue Devils football coaches
Wisconsin–Stout Blue Devils men's basketball coaches
Sportspeople from Waukegan, Illinois
Players of American football from Illinois